"Hitler was right" and "Hitler did nothing wrong" are controversial statements and internet memes either expressing support for Nazi dictator Adolf Hitler or trolling. The ironic or trolling uses of the phrase allow actual neo-Nazis to maintain plausible deniability over their neo-Nazi views.

History and usage

Before the 21st century 
In 1947, amidst a national outrage and widespread anti-semitic rioting over the hanging of two British officers by the Irgun in an event known as The Sergeants affair, angry mobs in North Wales wrote the words "Hitler was right" on Jewish properties. In Eccles, a crowd of around 700 people was told by former sergeant major John Regan that “Hitler was right. Exterminate every Jew – every man, woman and child. What are you afraid of? There’s only a handful of police." He was fined 15 pounds for the statement.

Colin Jordan, leader of the British National Socialist Movement argued in a 1962 speech titled "Hitler was right". Some witnesses recalled seeing banners stating "Hitler was right". In the early 1960s, Canadian neo-Nazi activist David Stanley distributed "Hitler was right" leaflets. In Germany in the 1960s neo-Nazis were convicted for distributing "Hitler was right" leaflets.

2000s 
One of the most-well known controversies relating to the 2001 Durban Conference on racism was the unfurling of a giant sign saying Hitler was right among a crowd of 20,000 protesters.

2010s 
On June 29, 2011, a user posted on 4chan Hitler Did Nothing Wrong and the phrase has continued to be used since January 30, 2012. After the statement went viral, the site was pulled and accompanied with an apology, but the site quickly went back for a while. The meme was originally on Mountain Dew's 2012 campaign, where in August 2012, 4chan users attacked a third-party sponsored Mountain Dew campaign called "Dub the Dew" on the contest with the name Hitler Did Nothing Wrong, which was a failure. The write-in contained Nazism, the statement as well as the Holocaust joke to climb to the top of the list, and the company shut down the contest. Adweek compared the incident to another recent campaign hijacked under similar circumstances, where musician Pitbull was sent to perform in Kodiak, Alaska, in a Walmart promotion. An analysis by USA Today found that Teespring was selling T-shirts reading "Hitler Did Nothing Wrong" and one with an image of Bill Cosby paired with the slogan "drinks on me ladies". After the huge controversy, an American Clothing website still continues to sell T-shirts with Nazi Slogans.

A bullfighting stadium in Pinto, Madrid was vandalized by neo-Nazis in 2013 with the phrase accompanied with a swastika, prompting a condemnation from the town's mayor, a People's Party member. The incident was noted by both a Pew Research Center report and the Bureau of Democracy, Human Rights, and Labor's chapter on Spain.

The concept of "Hitler as a Hero" was listed by the Simon Wiesenthal Center as the top sixth most anti-Semitic slur in 2013, with the subject's entry stating that "‘Hitler was right’ has emerged as a rallying cry not only for neo-Nazis but increasingly among some Arabs and Muslims."

The Microsoft chatbot Tay was trained in 2016 by internet users to use phrases such as "Hitler did nothing wrong" and "Hitler was right I hate the Jews". It was taken offline because of these statements.

People tweeting "Hitler was right" has been cited as an example of fascism on social media. A 2017 ProPublica investigation revealed that Facebook allowed advertisers to target users using antisemitic ad categories including "Hitler did nothing wrong".

In 2018, conspiracy theorist Steve West won the Republican primary for a district in the Missouri State House after stating "Hitler was right". The Missouri Republican Party did not endorse West. United States Rep. Mary Miller was criticized for stating at the 2021 United States Capitol attack that "Hitler was right on one thing. He said, 'Whoever has the youth has the future.'”

Welsh criminal Austin Ross went on a campaign of vandalistic acts and hate crimes from 2012 to 2018 which involved the defacement of locations across Newport, Wales. Ross carried out at least two arson attacks and regularly covered buildings with posters saying that "Hitler did nothing wrong."

2020s 
In 2021, Palestinian BBC journalist Tala Halawa was fired after it was discovered she had tweeted "#Israel is more #Nazi than #Hitler! Oh, #HitlerWasRight #IDF go to hell. #prayForGaza." during the 2014 Gaza War. In response to her suspension Halawa apologized for the tweet but insisted that she was the subject of character assassination by the Israel lobby.

On October 20, 2021, posters carrying the phrase were posted on the walls of a synagogue in Carmichael, California, by the far-right Aryan Nations terror group.

The Anti-Defamation League stated that it found 17,000 tweets using a variation of the phrase "Hitler was right" posted between 7 and 14 May 2021 during the 2021 Israel–Palestine crisis. According to the Network Contagion Research Institute, which cooperates with the ADL and Rutgers University, Iran-affiliated Twitter accounts posted antisemitic comments such as "Hitler was right" and "kill all Jews" 175 times per minute during the conflict.

References

Adolf Hitler
Neo-Nazi concepts
Internet trolling
4chan phenomena